Hans M. Dunshee (born October 26, 1953) is an American businessman and politician of the Democratic Party. He is a former member of the Washington House of Representatives, representing the 44th Legislative District.

Dunshee was born in Los Angeles, California.

In April 2016, Dunshee resigned from the Washington House of Representatives in order to take a seat on the Snohomish County Council. After losing election to a full term on the Snohomish County Council, Dunshee took a job as the Political Director for the Humane Society of the United States in Washington, DC.

Personal life 
Dunshee's wife is Theresa Dunshee. Dunshee has one step-child. Dunshee and his family live in Snohomish, Washington.

References

1953 births
Living people
Democratic Party members of the Washington House of Representatives
Snohomish County Councillors